The Paranoia Network, founded in November 2003, is a self-help user-run organisation in Sheffield, England, for people who have paranoid or delusional beliefs.

In contrast to mainstream psychiatry, that tends to see such beliefs as signs of psychopathology, the Paranoia Network promotes a philosophy of living with unusual and compelling beliefs, without necessarily pathologising them as signs of mental illness. It was partly inspired by the Hearing Voices Network's approach to auditory hallucinations.

What would otherwise seem to be a relatively minor disagreement over theory is complicated by the fact that people diagnosed as delusional can often be detained under mental health law and treated without their consent. Therefore, many of the criticisms of the diagnosis or definition have important ethical and political implications, which often leads to heated public debate.

See also
 Delusion
 Hearing Voices Network
 Paranoia

External links
 Launch of the Paranoia Network - from Asylum Online magazine.
 Finding a way out of paranoia - Guardian article on the Paranoia Network.

Schizophrenia-related organizations
Mental health support groups
Mental health organisations in the United Kingdom